While the future cannot be predicted with certainty, present understanding in various scientific fields allows for the prediction of some far-future events, if only in the broadest outline. These fields include astrophysics, which studies how planets and stars form, interact, and die; particle physics, which has revealed how matter behaves at the smallest scales; evolutionary biology, which studies how life evolves over time; plate tectonics, which shows how continents shift over millennia; and sociology, which examines how human societies and cultures evolve.

The far future begins after the current millennium comes to an end, starting with the 4th millennium in 3001 CE, and continues until the furthest reaches of future time. These timelines include alternative future events that address unresolved scientific questions, such as whether humans will become extinct, whether the Earth survives when the Sun expands to become a red giant and whether proton decay will be the eventual end of all matter in the Universe.

Lists
Keys

Earth, the Solar System, and the Universe

All projections of the future of Earth, the Solar System, and the universe must account for the second law of thermodynamics, which states that entropy, or a loss of the energy available to do work, must rise over time. Stars will eventually exhaust their supply of hydrogen fuel and burn out. The Sun will likely expand sufficiently to overwhelm many of the inner planets (Mercury, Venus, possibly Earth), but not the giant planets, including Jupiter and Saturn. Afterwards, the Sun would be reduced to the size of a white dwarf, and the outer planets and their moons would continue orbiting this diminutive solar remnant. This future situation may be similar to the white dwarf star MOA-2010-BLG-477L and the Jupiter-sized exoplanet orbiting it.

Long after the death of the solar system, physicists expect that matter itself will eventually disintegrate under the influence of radioactive decay, as even the most stable materials break apart into subatomic particles. Current data suggest that the universe has a flat geometry (or very close to flat), and thus will not collapse in on itself after a finite time. This infinite future allows for the occurrence of even massively improbable events, such as the formation of Boltzmann brains.

Humanity and human constructs

To date five spacecraft (Voyager 1, Voyager 2, Pioneer 10, Pioneer 11 and New Horizons) are on trajectories which will take them out of the Solar System and into interstellar space. Barring an extremely unlikely collision with some object, the craft should persist indefinitely.

Graphical timelines
For graphical, logarithmic timelines of these events see:
 Graphical timeline of the universe (to 8 billion years from now)
 Graphical timeline of the Stelliferous Era (to 1020 years from now)
 Graphical timeline from Big Bang to Heat Death (to 101000 years from now)

See also

 Chronology of the universe
 List of future astronomical events
 Detailed logarithmic timeline
 Location of Earth
 List of radioactive nuclides by half-life
 Orders of magnitude (time)
 Space and survival
 Timeline of the early universe
 Timeline of natural history
 Future of an expanding universe
 Ultimate fate of the universe

Notes

References

Bibliography